This is a list of some schools in the state of Georgia.

Appling County
 Fourth District Elementary School, Surrency

Baxley

 Appling County High School
 Appling County Middle School
 Altamaha Elementary School
 Appling County Primary School
 Appling County Elementary School

Atkinson County
 Willacoochee Elementary School, Willacoochee

Pearson

 Atkinson County High School
 Atkinson County Middle School
 Pearson Elementary School

Bacon County

 Bacon County High School, Alma
 Bacon County Middle School
 Bacon County Elementary School (grades 3 - 5)
 Bacon County Primary School (pre-school - grade 2)

Baker County
 Baker County School, Newton

Baldwin County
(all schools in Milledgeville, Georgia)

Baldwin High School
 Baldwin Success Academy
 Oak Hill Middle School
 Georgia College Montessori Academy
 Lakeside Elementary School
 Lakeview Academy
 Lakeview Primary School
 Midway Hills Academy
 Midway Hills Primary School

Private schools
John Milledge Academy

Banks County

 Banks County High School, Homer
 Banks County Middle School
 Banks County Elementary School (grades 3 - 5)
 Banks County Primary School (kindergarten - 2nd grade)

Barrow County

Auburn

 Auburn Elementary School
 Bramlett Elementary School

Bethlehem

Bethlehem Christian Academy
 Bethlehem Elementary School

Statham

 Bear-Creek Middle School
 Statham Elementary School

Winder

 Apalachee High School
 Barrow Arts & Sciences Academy
 Winder-Barrow High School
 Haymon-Morris Middle School
 Russell Middle School
 Westside Middle School
 County Line Elementary School
 Holsenbeck Elementary School
 Kennedy Elementary School
 Winder Elementary School
 Yargo Elementary School

Bartow County

 Woodland Middle School, Euharlee
 Allatoona Elementary School, Acworth
 Pine Log Elementary School, Rydal
 Taylorsville Elementary School, Taylorsville
 White Elementary School, White

Adairsville

 Adairsville High School
 Adairsville Middle School
 Adairsville Elementary School

Cartersville

 Cass High School
 Woodland High School
 Cass Middle School
 Clear Creek Elementary School
 Cloverleaf Elementary School
 Hamilton Crossing Elementary School
 Mission Road Elementary School

Emerson

 Red Top Middle School
 Emerson Elementary School

Kingston

 Euharlee Elementary School
 Kingston Elementary School

Cartersville City School District

 Cartersville Elementary School
 Cartersville High School
 Cartersville Middle School
 Cartersville Primary School

Ben Hill County

 Fitzgerald High School, Fitzgerald
 Ben Hill Middle School
 Ben Hill County Elementary School
 Ben Hill County Primary School

Berrien County

 Berrien High School, Nashville
 Berrien Middle School
 Berrien Elementary School
 Berrien Primary School

Bibb County
(all schools in Macon, Georgia)

Elementary schools

 Alexander II Magnet School
 Bernd Elementary School
 Bruce Elementary School
 Burdell-Hunt Magnet School
 Carter Elementary School
 Hartley Elementary School
 Heard Elementary School
 Heritage Elementary School
 Ingram-Pye Elementary School
 Dr. Martin Luther King Jr. Elementary School
 Lane Elementary School
 Porter Elementary School
 John R. Lewis Elementary School
 Skyview Elementary School
 Southfield Elementary School
 Springdale Elementary School
 Taylor Elementary School
 Union Elementary School
 Veterans Elementary School
 Vineville Academy of the Arts
 Williams Elementary School

Middle Schools

 Appling Middle School
 Ballard-Hudson Middle School
 Howard Middle School
 Miller Magnet Middle School
 Rutland Middle School
 Weaver Middle School

High schools

 Central High School
 Howard High School
 William S. Hutchings Career Center
 Northeast High School
 Rutland High School
 Southwest Magnet High School
 Westside High School

Charter schools

 The Academy for Classical Education
 Cirrus Academy Charter School

Private schools

 Central Fellowship Christian Academy
Covenant Academy
 First Presbyterian Day School
 Mount de Sales Academy
 Stratford Academy
 Tattnall Square Academy
 Windsor Academy

Bleckley County

 Bleckley County High School, Cochran
 Bleckley County Middle School
 Bleckley County Elementary School
 Bleckley County Primary School
 Bleckley County Success Academy

Brantley County
 Hoboken Elementary School, Hoboken

Nahunta

 Brantley County High School
 Brantley County Middle School
 Nahunta Elementary School
 Nahunta Primary School

Waynesville

 Atkinson Elementary School
 Waynesville Primary School

Brooks County
 North Brooks Elementary School, Morven

Quitman

Brooks County High School
 Delta Innovative School
 Brooks County Middle School
 Quitman Elementary School

Bryan County

Pembroke

 Bryan County High School
 Bryan County Middle School
 Bryan County Elementary School

Richmond Hill

 Richmond Hill High School
 Richmond Hill Middle School
 Carver Elementary School
 Frances Meeks Elementary School
 McAllister Elementary School
 Richmond Hill Elementary School
 Richmond Hill Primary School

Bulloch County

Brooklet

 Southeast Bulloch High School
 Southeast Bulloch Middle School
 Brooklet Elementary School
 Stilson Elementary School

Portal

 Portal Middle/High School
 Portal Elementary School

Statesboro

High schools

 Statesboro High School
 Charter Conservatory for Liberal Arts and Technology (CCAT (public school district))

Middle schools

 Langston Chapel Middle School
 William James Middle School

Elementary schools

 Julia P. Bryant Elementary School
 Langston Chapel Elementary School
 Mattie Lively Elementary School
 Mill Creek Elementary School
 Nevils Elementary School
 Sallie Zetterower Elementary School

Private/Charter Schools

 Bulloch Academy
 Statesboro STEAM Academy

Burke County
 Sardis-Girard-Alexander Elementary School, Sardis

Waynesboro

 Burke County Alternative School
 Burke County High School
 Burke County Middle School
 Blakeney Elementary School
 Waynesboro Primary School

Private schools

Edmund Burke Academy
Faith Christian Academy

Calhoun County
 Calhoun County Elementary School, Arlington

Edison

 Calhoun County Middle-High School
Pataula Charter Academy

Camden County

Kingsland

 Camden County High School
 Camden County Middle School
 David L. Rainer Elementary School
 Kingsland Elementary School
 Matilda Harris Elementary School

St. Marys

 St. Marys Middle School
 Crooked River Elementary School
 Mary Lee Clark Elementary School
 St. Marys Elementary School
 Sugarmill Elementary School

Woodbine

 Mamie Lou Gross Elementary School
 Woodbine Elementary School

Candler County

 Metter High School, Metter
 Metter Middle School
 Metter Intermediate School
 Metter Elementary School

Carroll County

 Mount Zion Middle School, Mount Zion
 Roopville Elementary School, Roopville
 Whitesburg Elementary School, Whitesburg

Bowdon

 Bowdon High School
 Bowdon Middle School
 Bowdon Elementary School

Carrollton

 Central High School
 Mount Zion High School
 Central Middle School
 Central Elementary School
 Mount Zion Elementary School
 Sand Hill Elementary School
 Sharp Creek Elementary School

Temple

 Temple High School
 Temple Middle School
 Villa Rica Middle School
 Providence Elementary School
 Temple Elementary School

Villa Rica

 Villa Rica High School
 Bay Springs Middle School
 Glanton-Hindsman Elementary School 
 Ithica Elementary School
 Villa Rica Elementary School

Carrollton City Schools

 Carrollton High School
 Carrollton Junior High School
 Carrollton Upper Elementary School
 Carrollton Elementary School

Private schools

 Liberty Eagle Academy, Carrollton
 Oak Grove Montessori School, Carrollton
 Oak Mountain Academy, Carrollton

Catoosa County

 Tiger Creek Elementary School, Tunnel Hill
 Woodstation Elementary School, Rock Spring

Fort Oglethorpe

 Lakeview – Fort Oglethorpe High School
 Battlefield Elementary School
 Battlefield Primary School

Ringgold

 Heritage High School
 Ringgold High School
 Heritage Middle School
 Ringgold Middle School
 Boynton Elementary School
 Graysville Elementary School
 Ringgold Elementary School
 Ringgold Primary School

Rossville

 Lakeview Middle School
 Cloud Springs Elementary School
 West Side Elementary School

Charlton County
 St. George Elementary School, St. George

Folkston

 Charlton County High School
 Bethune Middle School 
 Folkston Elementary School

Chatham County
 Garden City Elementary School, Garden City

Bloomingdale

New Hampstead High School
 Bloomingdale Elementary School

Pooler

 West Chatham Middle School
 Pooler Elementary School
 West Chatham Elementary School

Port Wentworth

 Rice Creek 3-8 School
 Port Wentworth Elementary School

Savannah

High schools

Alfred E. Beach High School
Groves High School
Islands High School
Jenkins High School
Savannah Arts Academy
Savannah Early College High School
Savannah High School
Sol C. Johnson High School
Windsor Forest High School
Woodville Tompkins Technical & Career High School

Middle schools

 Coastal Middle School
 DeRenne Middle School
 Hubert Middle School
 Mercer Middle School
 Myers Middle School
 Southwest Middle School
 STEM Academy at Bartlett

Elementary/K-8 schools

 Brock Elementary School
 Butler Elementary School
 Ellis Montessori Academy (K-8)
 Gadsden Elementary School
 Garrison School for the Arts (K-8)
 Georgetown K-8 School
 Godley Station K-8 School
 Gould Elementary School
 Haven Elementary School
 Heard Elementary School
 Hesse K-8 School
 Hodge Elementary School
 Humanities at Juliette Gordon Low Elementary School
 Isle of Hope K-8 School
 Jacob G. Smith Elementary School
 Largo-Tibet Elementary School
 Marshpoint Elementary School
 May Howard Elementary School
 New Hampstead K-8 School
 Pulaski Elementary School
 Shuman Elementary School
 Southwest Elementary School
 White Bluff Elementary School
 Williams Elementary School
 Windsor Forest Elementary School

Charter Schools

 Coastal Empire Montessori School
 Oglethorpe Charter School
 Savannah Classical Academy 
 Susie King Taylor Community School
 Tybee Island Maritime Academy

Private/Charter Schools

Benedictine Military School
Calvary Day School
Hancock Day School
Memorial Day School
Oglethorpe Charter School
Rambam Day School
Saint Andrew's School
St. Vincent's Academy
Savannah Christian Preparatory School
Savannah Country Day School

Chattahoochee County

 Chattahoochee County High School, Cusseta
 Chattahoochee County Middle School
 Chattahoochee County Educational Center

Chattooga County

 Lyerly Elementary School, Lyerly
 Menlo Elementary School, Menlo

Summerville

 Chattooga High School
 Summerville Middle School
 Leroy Massey Elementary School

Trion City School District
 Trion High School

Cherokee County

 Ball Ground Elementary School, Ball Ground
 R.M. Moore Elementary School STEM Academy, Waleska

Acworth

 Clark Creek Elementary School
Oak Grove Elementary School STEAM Academy

Private schools
Furtah Preparatory School

Canton

High schools

Cherokee High School
Creekview High School
Sequoyah High School

Middle schools

Creekland Middle School
Dean Rusk Middle School
 Freedom Middle School
 Teasley Middle School

Elementary schools

 Ace Academy
 Avery Elementary School
 Cherokee Charter Academy
 Clayton Elementary School
 Free Home Elementary School
 Hasty Elementary School Fine Arts Academy
 Hickory Flat Elementary School
 Holly Springs Elementary School STEM Academy
 Indian Knoll Elementary School
 Knox Elementary School STEM Academy
 Liberty Elementary School
 Macedonia Elementary School
 Sixes Elementary School

Woodstock

High schools

Etowah High School
River Ridge High School
Woodstock High School

Middle schools

ET Booth Middle School
 Mill Creek Middle School
 Woodstock Middle School

Elementary schools

 Arnold Mill Elementary School
 Bascomb Elementary School
 Boston Elementary School
 Carmel Elementary School
 Johnston Elementary School
 Little River Elementary School
 Mountain Road Elementary School
 Woodstock Elementary School

Private schools

Cherokee Christian Schools
CORE Community School
Lyndon Academy

Clarke County

Cleveland Road Elementary School, Bogart
Winterville Elementary School, Winterville

Athens

High schools

 Athens Community Career Academy
Cedar Shoals High School
Clarke Central High School
 Classic City High School

Middle schools

Burney-Harris-Lyons Middle School
Clarke Middle School
Coile Middle School
Hilsman Middle School

Elementary schools

Alps Road Elementary School
Barnett Shoals Elementary School
David C. Barrow Elementary School
Chase Street Elementary School
Fowler Drive Elementary School
Gaines Elementary School
Howard B. Stroud Elementary School
J.J. Harris Elementary School
Oglethorpe Avenue Elementary School
Timothy Road Elementary School
Whit Davis Road Elementary School
Whitehead Road Elementary School

Private schools

Athens Academy
Athens Christian School
Monsignor Donovan Catholic High School
St. Joseph Catholic Parish School

Clay County

 High School in Randolph County
 Clay County Middle School
 Clay County Elementary School

Clayton County

Lovejoy Middle School, Lovejoy
Anderson Elementary School, Conley
East Clayton Elementary School, Ellenwood
Lake City Elementary School, Lake City
River's Edge Elementary School, Fayetteville

College Park

 North Clayton High School
North Clayton Middle School
King Elementary School
Northcutt Elementary School
West Clayton Elementary School

Forest Park

 Forest Park High School
Babb Middle School
Forest Park Middle School
Edmonds Elementary School
Fountain Elementary School
Huie Elementary School
Unidos Dual Language School

Hampton

 Lovejoy High School
White Middle Academy
Hawthorne Elementary School
Kemp Elementary School
Kemp Primary School

Jonesboro

High schools

 Jonesboro High School
 Mount Zion High School
 Mundy's Mill High School

Middle schools

Elite Scholars Academy (6-12)
Jonesboro Middle School
Kendrick Middle School
Mundy's Mill Middle School
Pointe South Middle School
Roberts Middle School

Elementary schools

Arnold Elementary School
Brown Elementary School
Callaway Elementary School
Jackson Elementary School
Kilpatrick Elementary School
K.R. Pace School of the Arts
Lee Street Elementary School
Mt. Zion Elementary School
Mt. Zion Primary School
Suder Elementary School
Swint Elementary School

Morrow

 Morrow High School
Morrow Middle School
Haynie Elementary School
Marshall Elementary School
McGarrah Elementary School
Morrow Elementary School
Tara Elementary School

Rex

Adamson Middle School
Rex Mill Middle School
Smith Elementary School

Riverdale

High schools

 Charles Drew High School
 Riverdale High School

Middle schools

Riverdale Middle School
Sequoyah Middle School

Elementary schools

Church Street Elementary School
DuBois Integrity Academy
Harper Elementary School
Lake Ridge Elementary School
Oliver Elementary School
Pointe South Elementary School
Riverdale Elementary School

Private schools
Solid Rock Academy

Clinch County

 Clinch County High School, Homerville
 Clinch County Middle School
 Clinch County Elementary School

Cobb County

Acworth

 Allatoona High School
 Barber Middle School
 Durham Middle School
 Acworth Elementary School (2-5)
 Baker Elementary School
 Ford Elementary School
 Frey Elementary School
 McCall Primary School
 Pickett's Mill Elementary School
 Pitner Elementary School

Austell

 South Cobb High School
 Cooper Middle School
 Garrett Middle School
 Austell Elementary School
 Clarkdale Elementary School
 Sanders Elementary School

Private schools
 The Cumberland School

Kennesaw

High schools

 Harrison High School
 Kennesaw Mountain High School
 North Cobb High School

Middle schools

 Awtrey Middle School
 Lost Mountain Middle School
 McClure Middle School
 Palmer Middle School
 Pine Mountain Middle School

Elementary schools

 Big Shanty Elementary School
 Bullard Elementary School
 Chalker Elementary School
 Hayes Elementary School
 Kennesaw Elementary School
 Lewis Elementary School

Private/Charter schools

 First Baptist Christian School of Kennesaw
 Foundations for the Future School
 Mount Paran Christian School
 North Cobb Christian School
 Northwest Classical Academy
 Princeton Preparatory Schools

Mableton

 Pebblebrook High School
 Floyd Middle School
 Lindley Middle School/6th Grade Academy
 Bryant Elementary School
 City View Elementary School
 Clay Harmony Leland Elementary School
 Mableton Elementary School
 Riverside Elementary School

Charter schools
Amana Academy West Atlanta

Marietta

High schools

 Cobb Innovation & Technology Academy
 Kell High School
 Lassiter High School
 Osborne High School
 Pope High School
 Sprayberry High School
 Walton High School
 Wheeler High School

Middle schools

 Daniell Middle School
 Dickerson Middle School
 Dodgen Middle School
 East Cobb Middle School
 Hightower Trail Middle School
 Mabry Middle School
 McCleskey Middle School
 Pearson Middle School
 Simpson Middle School
 Smitha Middle School

Elementary schools

 Addison Elementary School
 Bells Ferry Elementary School
 Birney Elementary School
 Blackwell Elementary School
 Brumby Elementary School
 Cheatham Hill Elementary School
 Davis Elementary School
 Dowell Elementary School
 Due West Elementary School
 East Side Elementary School
 Eastvalley Elementary School
 Fair Oaks Elementary School
 Garrison Mill Elementary School
 Hollydale Elementary School
 Keheley Elementary School
 Kincaid Elementary School
 LaBelle Elementary School
 Milford Elementary School
 Mount Bethel Elementary School
 Mountain View Elementary School
 Murdock Elementary School
 Nicholson Elementary School
 Powers Ferry Elementary School
 Rocky Mount Elementary School
 Sedalia Park Elementary School
 Shallowford Falls Elementary School
 Sope Creek Elementary School
 Timber Ridge Elementary School
 Tritt Elementary School

Private schools

 Dominion Christian High School
 Mt. Bethel Christian Academy
 St. Joseph Catholic School
 The Walker School

Powder Springs

High schools

 Hillgrove High School
 McEachern High School

Middle schools

 Lovinggood Middle School
 Tapp Middle School

Elementary school

 Compton Elementary School
 Hendricks Elementary School
 Kemp Elementary School
Miles Ahead Charter School
 Powder Springs Elementary School
 Still Elementary School
 Varner Elementary School
 Vaughan Elementary School

Smyrna

 Campbell High School
 Campbell Middle School
 Griffin Middle School
 Argyle Elementary School
 Belmont Hills Elementary School
 Birney Elementary School
 Green Acres Elementary School
 King Springs Elementary School
 Nickajack Elementary School
 Norton Park Elementary School
 Russell Elementary School
 Smyrna Elementary School
 Teasley Elementary School

Private/Charter schools

International Academy of Smyrna
St. Benedict's Episcopal School
 Whitefield Academy

Marietta City Schools

 Marietta High School
 Marietta Middle School
 Marietta Sixth Grade Academy
 A.L. Burruss Elementary School
 Dunleith Elementary School
 Hickory Hills Elementary School
 Lockheed Elementary School
 Marietta Center for Advanced Academics
 Park Street Elementary School
 Sawyer Road Elementary School
 West Side Elementary School

Coffee County

 Ambrose Elementary School, Ambrose
 Broxton-Mary Hayes Elementary School, Broxton
 Nicholls Elementary School, Nicholls
 West Green Elementary School, West Green

Douglas

 Coffee High School
 George Washington Carver Freshman Campus
 Wiregrass Regional College and Career Academy
 Coffee Middle School
 Eastside Elementary School
 Indian Creek Elementary School
 Satilla Elementary School
 Westside Elementary School

Private schools
 Citizens Christian Academy

Colquitt County

Doerun Elementary School, Doerun
Funston Elementary School, Funston
Hamilton Elementary School, Hartsfield
Norman Park Elementary School, Norman Park

Moultrie

 Colquitt County High School
C.A. Gray Jr High School
Willie J. Williams Middle School
Cox Elementary School
Odom Elementary School
Okapilco Elementary School
Stringfellow Elementary School
Sunset Elementary School
Wright Elementary School
Gear Elementary School

Columbia County
 North Columbia Elementary School, Appling

Evans

High schools

 Evans High School
 Greenbrier High School
 Lakeside High School

Middle schools

 Evans Middle School
 Greenbrier Middle School
 Lakeside Middle School
 Riverside Middle School

Elementary schools

 Blue Ridge Elementary School
 Evans Elementary School
 Greenbrier Elementary School
 Lewiston Elementary School
 Parkway Elementary School
 River Ridge Elementary School
 Riverside Elementary School
 School for Arts Infused Learning

Grovetown

 Grovetown High School
 Columbia Middle School
 Grovetown Middle School
 Baker Place Elementary School
 Brookwood Elementary School
 Cedar Ridge Elementary School
 Euchee Creek Elementary School
 Grovetown Elementary School

Harlem

 Harlem High School
 Harlem Middle School
 North Harlem Elementary School

Martinez

 Stallings Island Middle School
 Martinez Elementary School
 South Columbia Elementary School
 Stevens Creek Elementary School
 Westmont Elementary School

Private schools

 Augusta Christian Schools
 Augusta Preparatory Day School

Cook County

Cook County High School
 Cook County Middle School
 Cook County Elementary School
 Cook County Primary School

Coweta County

 Glanton Elementary School, Grantville
 Moreland Elementary School, Moreland

Newnan

High schools

Central Education Center (CEC)
Newnan High School
Northgate High School
Winston Dowdell Academy

Middle schools

 Arnall Middle School
 Central Education Center (CEC) - 8th Grade Academy
 Evans Middle School
 Madras Middle School
 Maggie Brown Middle School
 Smokey Road Middle School

Elementary school

 Arbor Springs Elementary School
 Arnco-Sargent Elementary School
 Atkinson Elementary School
 Brooks Elementary School
 Elm Street Elementary School
 Jefferson Parkway Elementary School
 Newnan Crossing Elementary School
 Northside Elementary School
 Ruth Hill Elementary School
 Welch Elementary School
 Western Elementary School
 White Oak Elementary School

Private/Charter schools

The Heritage School
Odyssey Charter School

Senoia

 East Coweta Middle School
 Coweta Charter Academy
 Eastside Elementary School

Sharpsburg

East Coweta High School
 Blake Bass Middle School
 Lee Middle School
 Canongate Elementary School
 Poplar Road Elementary School
 Thomas Crossroads Elementary School
 Willis Road Elementary School

Private schools
Trinity Christian School

Crawford County

 Crawford County High School, Roberta
 Crawford County Middle School
 Crawford County Elementary School

Crisp County

 Crisp County High School, Cordele
 Crisp County Middle School
 Crisp County Elementary School
 Crisp County Primary School

Private schools
Crisp Academy

Dade County

 Dade County High School, Trenton
 Dade County Middle School
 Dade Elementary School
 Davis Elementary School

Dawson County

 Dawson County High School, Dawsonville
 Dawson County Middle School
 Dawson County Junior High School
Black's Mill Elementary School
Kilough Elementary School
Robinson Elementary School
Riverview Elementary School

Decatur County

 Bainbridge High School, Bainbridge
 Bainbridge Middle School
 Hutto Elementary School
 Jones-Wheat Primary School
 West Bainbridge Primary School

Private/Charter schools

Grace Christian Academy
 Spring Creek Charter Academy

DeKalb County
Robert Shaw Elementary School, Scottdale

Atlanta

High schools

 Cross Keys High School
 Druid Hills High School
 Lakeside High School
 Ronald McNair Sr. High School

Middle schools

 DeKalb Path Academy (5-8)
Henderson Middle School
Peachtree Charter Middle School
 Tapestry Public Charter School

Elementary schools

Ashford Park Elementary School
Barack H. Obama Elementary Magnet School of Technology
Briar Vista Elementary School
Fernbank Elementary School
Globe Academy (K-6)
Hawthorne Elementary School
Henderson Mill Elementary School
Ivy Prep Academy at Kirkwood (K-8, Charter)
John Robert Lewis Elementary School
Kittredge Magnet School
Montclair Elementary School
Montgomery Elementary School
Oak Grove Elementary School
Sagamore Hills Elementary School
Woodward Elementary School

Private schools

 Ben Franklin Academy
 Marist School
 Mohammed Schools of Atlanta
 The Paideia School
 St. Pius X Catholic High School
 Yeshiva Ohr Yisrael

Avondale Estates

 DeKalb School of the Arts
Avondale Elementary School
DeKalb Elementary School of the Arts (K-7)

Chamblee

 Chamblee Charter High School
 Warren Technical School
 Chamblee Middle School
Dresden Elementary School
Huntley Hills Elementary School

Clarkston

 Clarkston High School
 DeKalb Early College Academy
 Indian Creek Elementary School
Jolly Elementary School

Decatur

High schools

 Columbia High School
 DeKalb High School of Technology South
 Flex Academy/William Bradley Bryant Center for Technology
 Southwest DeKalb High School
 Towers High School

Middle schools

Cedar Grove Middle School
Chapel Hill Middle School
Columbia Middle School
Druid Hills Middle School
Mary McLeod Bethune Middle School
Miller Grove Middle School
 The Museum School Of Avondale Estates
Ronald McNair, Sr. Middle School

Elementary schools

Bob Mathis Elementary School
Briarlake Elementary School
Canby Lane Elementary School
Chapel Hill Elementary School
Columbia Elementary School
 DeKalb Preparatory Academy (K-7)
Flat Shoals Elementary School
 International Community School
Kelley Lake Elementary School
Laurel Ridge Elementary School
McLendon Elementary School
Narvie J.Harris Elementary School
Oak View Elementary School
Peachcrest Elementary School
Rainbow Elementary School
Ronald E. McNair Discovery Learning Academy
Snapfinger Elementary School
Toney Elementary School
Wadsworth Magnet School

Private/Charter schools

 Academe of the Oaks
 Academy of Scholars
 DeKalb Brilliance Academy
 Friends School of Atlanta
 PEACE Academy
 The Waldorf School of Atlanta

Doraville

Sequoyah Middle School
Cary Reynolds Elementary School
Dora United Elementary School
Evansdale Elementary School
Georgia Fugees Academy Charter School
Hightower Elementary School
Oakcliff Traditional Theme School
Pleasantdale Elementary School

Dunwoody

 Dunwoody High School
Austin Elementary School
Chesnut Elementary Charter School
Dunwoody Elementary School
Kingsley Elementary Charter School
Vanderlyn Elementary School

Private schools
Dunwoody Christian School

Ellenwood

 Cedar Grove High School
 Utopian Academy for the Arts
 Cedar Grove Elementary School

Lithonia

High schools

 Arabia Mountain High School
 Lithonia High School
 Martin Luther King, Jr. High School
 Miller Grove High School

Middle schools

Lithonia Middle School
Redan Middle School
Salem Middle School

Elementary schools

Arete Preparatory School
Browns Mill Elementary School
E.L. Bouie Elementary School
Fairington Elementary School
Flat Rock Elementary School
 Leadership Preparatory Academy (K-8)
Marbut Elementary School
Murphey Candler Elementary School
Panola Way Elementary School
Princeton Elementary School
Redan Elementary School
Rock Chapel Elementary School
Shadow Rock Elementary School
Stoneview Elementary School

Stone Mountain

High schools

 DeKalb Alternative High School
 Elizabeth Andrews High School
 Redan High School
 Stephenson High School
 Stone Mountain High School

Middle schools

The Champion School
Freedom Middle School
Stephenson Middle School
Stone Mountain Middle School

Elementary schools

 Allgood Elementary School
 Dekalb Academy of Technology and Environment (K-8)
Dunaire Elementary School
Eldridge Miller Elementary School
Hambrick Elementary School
Pine Ridge Elementary School
Rockbridge Elementary School
Rowland Elementary School
Stone Mill Elementary School
Stone Mountain Elementary School
Woodridge Elementary School
Wynbrooke Elementary School

Private schools

 Greenforest-McCalep Christian Academy
Smoke Rise Prep School

Tucker

 Tucker High School
Tucker Middle School
Brockett Elementary School
Idlewood Elementary School
Livsey Elementary School
Midvale Elementary School
Smoke Rise Elementary School

City Schools of Decatur

 Decatur High School
 Renfroe Middle School
Fifth Avenue Upper Elementary School (3–5)
Talley Street Upper Elementary School (3–5)
Clairemont Elementary School (K–2)
Glennwood Elementary School (K–2)
Oakhurst Elementary School (K–2)
Westchester Elementary School (K–2)
Winnona Park Elementary School (K–2)

Dodge County

Dodge County High School, Eastman
Dodge County Middle School
North Dodge Elementary School
South Dodge Elementary School

Dooly County
 Dooly County High School, Vienna

Pinehurst

Dooly County K-8 Academy
Fullington Academy

Dougherty County
(all schools in Albany, Georgia)

High schools 

Dougherty Comprehensive High School
Monroe Comprehensive High School
Westover Comprehensive High School

Middle schools 

 Albany Middle School
 Merry Acres Middle School
 Radium Springs Middle Magnet School of the Arts
 Robert A. Cross Middle Magnet School

Elementary schools 

 Alice Coachman Elementary School
 International Studies Elementary Charter School
 Lake Park Elementary School
 Lamar Reese Magnet School of the Arts
 Lincoln Elementary Magnet School
 Live Oak Elementary School
 Martin Luther King Jr. Elementary School
 Morningside Elementary School
 Northside Elementary School
 Radium Springs Elementary School
 Robert H. Harvey Elementary School
 Sherwood Acres Elementary School
 Turner Elementary School
 West Town Elementary School

Private schools 

Byne Christian School
Deerfield-Windsor School
Sherwood Christian Academy

Douglas County
 Mirror Lake Elementary School, Villa Rica

Douglasville

High schools

 Chapel Hill High School
 Douglas County High School
 New Manchester High School
 Robert S. Alexander High School

Middle schools

 Chapel Hill Middle School
 Chestnut Log Middle School
 Factory Shoals Middle School
 Fairplay Middle School
 Stewart Middle School
 Yeager Middle School

Elementary schools

 Arbor Station Elementary School
 Beulah Elementary School
 Bill Arp Elementary School
 Bright Star Elementary School
 Burnett Elementary School
 Chapel Hill Elementary School
 Dorsett Shoals Elementary School
 Eastside Elementary School
 Holly Springs Elementary School
 Mirror Lake Elementary School
 Mt. Carmel Elementary School
 New Manchester Elementary School
 North Douglas Elementary School
 South Douglas Elementary School

Private schools

Harvester Christian Academy
Heirway Christian Academy

Lithia Springs

 Lithia Springs High School
 Turner Middle School
 Delta STEAM Academy
 Annette Winn Elementary School
 Factory Shoals Elementary School
 Lithia Springs Elementary School
 Sweetwater Elementary School

Winston

 Mason Creek Elementary School
 Winston Elementary School

Early County
 Southwest Georgia Academy, Damascus

Blakely

Early County High School
 Early County Middle School
 Early County Elementary School

Echols County
 Echols County School, Statenville

Effingham County

Guyton

 South Effingham High School
 Effingham County Middle School
 South Effington Middle School
 Guyton Elementary School
 Marlow Elementary School
 Sand Hill Elementary School
 South Effingham Elementary School

Rincon

 Effingham College & Career Academy
 Ebenezer Middle School
 Blandford Elementary School
 Ebenezer Elementary School
 Rincon Elementary School

Springfield

 Effingham County High School
 Springfield Elementary School

Elbert County
 Elbert County High School, Elberton

Emanuel County
David Emanuel Academy, Stillmore

Swainsboro

 Swainsboro High School
 Swainsboro Middle School
 Swainsboro Elementary School
 Swainsboro Primary School

Twin City

 Emanuel County Institute
 Twin City Elementary School

Evans County
Pinewood Christian Academy, Bellville

Claxton

Claxton High School
Claxton Middle School
Claxton Elementary School

Fannin County

Fannin County High School, Blue Ridge
 Fannin County Middle School
 Blue Ridge Elementary School
 East Fannin Elementary School
 West Fannin Elementary School

Fayette County
Liberty Tech Charter School, Brooks

Fayetteville

High schools

Fayette County High School
Starr's Mill High School
Whitewater High School

Middle schools

 Fayette LIFE Academy (6-12)
 Bennett's Mill Middle School
Rising Starr Middle School
 Whitewater Middle School

Elementary schools

 Cleveland Elementary School
 Fayetteville Elementary School
 Inman Elementary School
 North Fayette Elementary School
 Peeples Elementary School
 Sara Harp Minter Elementary School
 Spring Hill Elementary School

Private schools

Grace Christian Academy
St. Mary's Academy

Peachtree City

McIntosh High School
 J.C. Booth Middle School
 Braelinn Elementary School
 Crabapple Lane Elementary School
 Huddleston Elementary School
 Kedron Elementary School
 Oak Grove Elementary School
 Peachtree City Elementary School

Tyrone

Sandy Creek High School
 Flat Rock Middle School
 Robert J. Burch Elementary School

Floyd County

Berry College Elementary & Middle School, Mount Berry
Midway Primary School, Silver Creek

Armuchee

Armuchee High School
Armuchee Middle School
Armuchee Elementary School

Cave Spring

Georgia School for the Deaf
Cave Spring Elementary School

Coosa

Coosa High School
Coosa Middle School
Coosa Elementary School

Lindale

Pepperell High School
Pepperell Middle School
Pepperell Elementary School
Pepperell Primary School

Rome

Model High School
Model Middle School
Alto Park
Garden Lakes Elementary School
Glenwood Elementary School
Johnson Elementary School
McHenry Elementary School

Private schools

Darlington School
St. Mary's Catholic School
Unity Christian School

Rome City School District

Rome High School
Rome Middle School
Anna K. Davie Elementary School
East Central Elementary School
Elm Street Elementary School
Main Elementary School
West Central Elementary School
West End Elementary School

Forsyth County

Alpharetta

 DeSana Middle School
 Brandywine Elementary School
 Midway Elementary School

Cumming

 Alliance Academy for Innovation
Denmark High School
Forsyth Central High School
North Forsyth High School
South Forsyth High School
West Forsyth High School

Middle schools

 Gateway Academy (6-12)
 Hendricks Middle School
 Lakeside Middle School
Liberty Middle School
Little Mill Middle School
 North Forsyth Middle School
 Otwell Middle School
 Piney Grove Middle School
South Forsyth Middle School
 Vickery Creek Middle School

Elementary schools

 Big Creek Elementary School
 Brookwood Elementary School
 Chattahoochee Elementary School
 Coal Mountain Elementary School
 Cumming Elementary School
 Daves Creek Elementary School
 Haw Creek Elementary School
 Kelly Mill Elementary School
 Mashburn Elementary School
 Matt Elementary School
 New Hope Elementary School
 Poole's Mill Elementary School
 Sawnee Elementary School
 Shiloh Point Elementary School
 Silver City Elementary School
 Vickery Creek Elementary School
 Whitlow Elementary School

Private schools

Cornerstone Schools
Covenant Christian Academy
Fideles Christian School
Horizon Christian Academy
Pinecrest Academy

Gainesville

 East Forsyth High School
 Chestatee Elementary School

Private schools

Lakeview Academy
Riverside Military Academy

Suwanee

Lambert High 
 Riverwatch Middle School
 Johns Creek Elementary School
 Settles Bridge Elementary School
 Sharon Elementary School

Franklin County

Lavonia Elementary School, Lavonia
Royston Elementary School, Royston
Shepherd's Hill Academy, Martin

Carnesville

Franklin County High School
Franklin County Middle School
Carnesville Elementary School

Fulton County

Alpharetta Cluster, Alpharetta

Alpharetta High School
 Webb Bridge Middle School
 Creek View Elementary School
 Lake Windward Elementary School
 Manning Oaks Elementary School
 New Prospect Elementary School

Banneker Cluster, College Park

Banneker High School
 Crossroads Second Chance South Alternative School
 Ronald E. McNair Middle School
 Feldwood Elementary School
 Heritage Elementary School
 Love T. Nolan Elementary School
 Mary McLeod Bethune Elementary School
 S.L. Lewis Elementary School

Cambridge/Milton Clusters, Milton

High schools

 Cambridge High School (Georgia)
 Milton High School

Middle schools

 Hopewell Middle School
 Northwestern Middle School

Elementary schools

 Alpharetta Elementary School
 Birmingham Falls Elementary School
 Cogburn Woods Elementary School
 Crabapple Crossing Elementary School
 Manning Oaks Elementary School
 Summit Hill Elementary School

Centennial Cluster, Roswell

Centennial High School
 Haynes Bridge Middle School
 Holcomb Bridge Middle School
 Barnwell Elementary School
 Esther Jackson Elementary School
 Hillside Elementary School
 Northwood Elementary School
 River Eves Elementary School

Chattahoochee Cluster, Johns Creek

Chattahoochee High School
 Taylor Road Middle School
 Abbotts Hill Elementary School
 Findley Oaks Elementary School
 Ocee Elementary School
 State Bridge Crossing Elementary School

Creekside Cluster, Fairburn

Creekside High School
 Bear Creek Middle School
 Evoline C. West Elementary School
 Campbell Elementary School
 Palmetto Elementary School

Johns Creek Cluster, Johns Creek

Johns Creek High School
 Autrey Mill Middle School
 Dolvin Elementary School
 Medlock Bridge Elementary School

Langston Hughes Cluster, Fairburn

Langston Hughes High School
 Renaissance Middle School
 Cliftondale Elementary School
 Gullatt Elementary School
 Liberty Point Elementary School
 Renaissance Elementary School

North Springs Cluster, Sandy Springs

North Springs Charter School of Arts and Sciences
 Dunwoody Springs Charter Elementary School
 Ison Springs Elementary School
 Sandy Springs Middle School
 Spalding Drive Charter Elementary School
 Woodland Charter Elementary School

Northview Cluster, Johns Creek

Northview High School
 River Trail Middle School
 Shakerag Elementary School
 Wilson Creek Elementary School

Riverwood Cluster, Sandy Springs

Riverwood High School
 Ridgeview Charter Middle School
 Heards Ferry Elementary School
 High Point Elementary School
 Lake Forest Elementary School

Roswell Cluster, Roswell

Independence High School
Roswell High School
Crossroads Second Chance North Alternative School
 Crabapple Middle School
 Elkins Pointe Middle School
 Hembree Springs Elementary School
 Mimosa Elementary School
 Mountain Park Elementary School
 Roswell North Elementary School
 Sweet Apple Elementary School

Tri-Cities Cluster, East Point

Tri-Cities High School
 Paul D. West Middle School
 Woodland Middle School
 Asa Grant Hilliard Elementary School
 Brookview Elementary School
 College Park Elementary School
 Conley Hills Elementary School
 Hamilton E. Holmes Elementary School
 Hapeville Elementary School
 Harriet Tubman Elementary School
 Parklane Elementary School

Westlake Cluster, Atlanta

Westlake High School
 Camp Creek Middle School
 Frank D. McClarin Success Academy
 Sandtown Middle School
 A. Philip Randolph Elementary School
 Seaborn Lee Elementary School
 Stonewall Tell Elementary School

Charter Schools

 Chattahoochee Hills Charter School, Chattahoochee Hills
 Hapeville Career Academy, Union City
 Hapeville Charter Middle School, Hapeville
 Riverwood International Charter School, Sandy Springs

Alpharetta

 Amana Academy Charter School
 International Charter School of Atlanta (4-8)

College Park

Atlanta Unbound Academy
Liberation Academy
 The Main Street Academy
Resurgence Hall Charter School
 Skyview High School

East Point

 Fulton Leadership Academy
 KIPP South Fulton Academy
 RISE Grammar School
 RISE Prep School

Roswell

 Fulton Academy of Science & Technology
 International Charter School of Atlanta (K-3)

Atlanta Public Schools

Carver Cluster

The New Schools at Carver
 Luther Judson Price Middle School
 Sylvan Hills Middle School
 Finch Elementary School
 Gideons Elementary School
 Perkerson Elementary School
 Slater Elementary School
 Thomasville Heights Elementary School

Douglass Cluster

Douglass High School
 John Lewis Invictus Academy (6-8)
 Boyd Elementary School
 Frank Lebby Stanton Elementary School
 Harper-Archer Elementary School
 KIPP Woodson Park Academy (K-8)
 Scott Elementary School
 Usher-Collier Elementary School

Jackson Cluster

Maynard H. Jackson High School
 Martin Luther King Jr. Middle School
 Atlanta Neighborhood Charter School
 Barack & Michelle Obama Academy
 Benteen Elementary School
 Burgess/Peterson Elementary School
 Dunbar Elementary School
 Fred A. Toomer Elementary School
 Parkside Elementary School
 Wesley International Academy

Mays Cluster

Benjamin Elijah Mays High School
 Jean Childs Young Middle School
 Beecher Hills Elementary School
 Cascade Elementary School
 Miles Elementary School
 Peyton Forest Elementary School
 West Manor Elementary School

Midtown Cluster

 Midtown High School
 David T. Howard Middle School
 Centennial Academy Elementary School
 Hope-Hill Elementary School
 The Kindezi School Old Fourth Ward
 Mary Lin Elementary School
 Morningside Elementary School
 Springdale Park Elementary School

North Atlanta Cluster

North Atlanta High School
 Sutton Middle School
 Bolton Academy Elementary School
 Garden Hills Elementary School
 Morris Brandon Elementary School
 Rivers Elementary School
 Sarah Smith Elementary School
 W.T. Jackson Elementary School

South Atlanta Cluster

South Atlanta High School
 C. Williamson Long Middle School
 Cleveland Avenue Elementary School
 Dobbs Elementary School
 Heritage Academy Elementary School
 Humphries Elementary School
 Hutchinson Elementary School

Therrell Cluster

Therrell High School
 Ralph Johnson Bunche Middle School
 Continental Colony Elementary School
 Deerwood Academy Elementary School
 Fickett Elementary School
 Kimberly Elementary School

Washington Cluster

Washington High School
 H.J. Russell West End Academy
 Hollis Innovation Academy
 M. Agnes Jones Elementary School
 Tuskegee Airmen Global Academy

Charter/Specialized Schools

Atlanta Classical Academy
Atlanta Heights Charter School
The B.E.S.T. Academy
Coretta Scott King Young Women's Leadership Academy
Drew Charter School
Ethos Classical School
Genesis Innovation Academy
KIPP Atlanta (Atlanta Collegiate HS, Soul, STRIVE, Vision, WAYS)
Open Campus High School
SLAM! Atlanta
Westside Atlanta Charter School

Private Schools - Fulton County

Alpharetta

Fulton Science Academy Private School
King's Ridge Christian School
The Lionheart School
McGinnis Woods Country Day School
Rivers Academy
St. Francis Schools

College Park

Woodward Academy
The Wright School

Fairburn

Arlington Christian School
Landmark Christian School
Our Lady of Mercy Catholic High School

Johns Creek

Mount Pisgah Christian School
William & Reed Academy

Roswell

Blessed Trinity Catholic High School
The Cottage School
Eaton Academy
Fellowship Christian School
High Meadows School
St. Francis Schools

Sandy Springs

Brandon Hall School
Mount Vernon Presbyterian School
Springmont Montessori School
Weber School

Private Schools - Atlanta

Annunciation Day School
Atlanta Adventist Academy
Atlanta Girls' School
Atlanta International School
Atlanta Jewish Academy
Atlanta Youth Academy
Christ the King School
Cliff Valley School
Cristo Rey Atlanta Jesuit High School
Dar-Un-Noor/Atlanta Science Academy
The Epstein School
The Galloway School
The Davis Academy
Heritage Preparatory School
Holy Innocents' Episcopal School
Holy Spirit Preparatory School
Imhotep Academy
The Lovett School
The Mount Vernon School
The New School
Pace Academy
Paideia School
The Piedmont School of Atlanta
Southwest Atlanta Christian Academy
St. Martin's Episcopal School
Temima High School for Girls
Torah Day School of Atlanta
Trinity Elementary School
The Westminster Schools

Gilmer County

Gilmer High School, Ellijay
Clear Creek Middle School
Clear Creek Elementary School
Ellijay Elementary School

Glascock County
Glascock County Consolidated School, Gibson

Glynn County

Brunswick

High schools

Brunswick High School
Coastal Plains Education Charter High School
Glynn Academy High School
Golden Isles College & Career Academy

Middle schools

Glynn Middle School
Jane Macon Middle School
Needwood Middle School
Risley Middle School

Elementary schools

Altama Elementary School
Burroughs-Molette Elementary School
C.B. Greer Elementary School
Glyndale Elementary School
Golden Isles Elementary School
Goodyear Elementary School
Satilla Marsh Elementary School
Sterling Elementary School

Private schools
Heritage Christian Academy

St. Simons Island

Oglethorpe Point Elementary School
St. Simons Elementary School

Private schools
Frederica Academy

Gordon County

Fairmount Elementary School, Fairmount
Tolbert Elementary School, Resaca
W.L. Swain Elementary School, Plainville

Calhoun

High schools

Gordon Central High School
Gordon County College & Career Academy
Sonoraville High School

Middle schools

Ashworth Middle School
Red Bud Middle School

Elementary schools

Belwood Elementary School
Red Bud Elementary School
Sonoraville Elementary School

Private schools
Georgia-Cumberland Academy

Calhoun City School District

Calhoun High School
Calhoun Middle School
Calhoun Elementary School
Calhoun Primary School

Grady County

Shiver Elementary, Pelham
Whigham Elementary School, Whigham

Cairo

Cairo High School
Washington Middle School
Eastside Elementary School
Northside Elementary School
Southside Elementary School

Greene County
Nathanael Greene Academy, Siloam

Greensboro

Greene County High School
Anita White Carson Middle School
Lake Oconee Academy (K-12)
Greensboro Elementary School
Union Point STEAM Academy

Gwinnett County

Archer Cluster, Lawrenceville

Archer High School
McConnell Middle School
Cooper Elementary School
Harbins Elementary School
Lovin Elementary School

Berkmar Cluster, Lilburn

Berkmar High School
Berkmar Middle School
Sweetwater Middle School
Bethesda Elementary School
Corley Elementary School
Hopkins Elementary School
Kanoheda Elementary School
Minor Elementary School

Brookwood Cluster, Snellville

Brookwood High School
Alton C. Crews Middle School
Five Forks Middle School
Brookwood Elementary School
Craig Elementary School
Gwin Oaks Elementary School
Head Elementary School

Central Gwinnett Cluster, Lawrenceville

Central Gwinnett High School
Jordan Middle School
Moore Middle School
Jenkins Elementary School
Lawrenceville Elementary School
Oakland Meadow School (K-8)
Simonton Elementary School
Winn Holt Elementary School

Collins Hill Cluster, Suwanee

Collins Hill High School
Creekland Middle School
McKendree Elementary School
Rock Springs Elementary School
Taylor Elementary School
Walnut Grove Elementary School

Dacula Cluster, Dacula

Dacula High School
Dacula Middle School
Alcova Elementary School
Dacula Elementary School
Mulberry Elementary School

Discovery Cluster, Lawrenceville

Discovery High School (Georgia)
Richards Middle School
Alford Elementary School
Baggett Elementary School
Benefield Elementary School
Cedar Hill Elementary School

Duluth Cluster, Duluth

Duluth High School
Coleman Middle School
Duluth Middle School
Berkeley Lake Elementary School
Chattahoochee Elementary School
Chesney Elementary School
Harris Elementary School

Grayson Cluster, Loganville

Grayson High School
Bay Creek Middle School
Couch Middle School
Grayson Elementary School
Pharr Elementary School
Starling Elementary School
Trip Elementary School

Lanier Cluster, Sugar Hill

Lanier High School
Lanier Middle School
Sugar Hill Elementary School
Sycamore Elementary School
White Oak Elementary School

Meadowcreek Cluster, Norcross

Meadowcreek High School
McClure Health Science High School
Lilburn Middle School
Radloff Middle School
Ferguson Elementary School
Graves Elementary School
Lilburn Elementary School
Meadowcreek Elementary School
Nesbit Elementary School
Rockbridge Elementary School

Mill Creek Cluster, Hoschton

Mill Creek High School
Osborne Middle School
Duncan Creek Elementary School
Fort Daniel Elementary School
Puckett's Mill Elementary School

Mountain View Cluster, Lawrenceville

Mountain View High School
Twin Rivers Middle School
Dyer Elementary School
Freeman's Mill Elementary School
Woodward Mill Elementary School

Norcross Cluster, Norcross

Norcross High School
Paul Duke STEM High School
Pinckneyville Middle School
Summerour Middle School
Baldwin Elementary School
Beaver Ridge Elementary School
Norcross Elementary School
Peachtree Elementary School
Simpson Elementary School
Stripling Elementary School

North Gwinnett Cluster, Suwanee

North Gwinnett High School
North Gwinnett Middle School
Level Creek Elementary School
Riverside Elementary School
Roberts Elementary School
Suwanee Elementary School

Parkview Cluster, Lilburn

Parkview High School
Trickum Middle School
Arcado Elementary School
Camp Creek Elementary School
Knight Elementary School
Mountain Park Elementary School

Peachtree Ridge Cluster, Suwanee

Peachtree Ridge High School
Northbrook Middle School
Richard Hull Middle School
Burnette Elementary School
Jackson Elementary School
Mason Elementary School
Parsons Elementary School

Seckinger Cluster, Buford

Seckinger High School
Jones Middle School
Harmony Elementary School
Ivy Creek Elementary School
Patrick Elementary School

Shiloh Cluster, Snellville

Shiloh High School
Shiloh Middle School
Anderson-Livsey Elementary School
Annistown Elementary School
Centerville Elementary School
Partee Elementary School
Shiloh Elementary School

South Gwinnett Cluster, Snellville

South Gwinnett High School
Grace Snell Middle School
Snellville Middle School
Britt Elementary School
Magill Elementary School
Norton Elementary School
Rosebud Elementary School

Specialized/Charter Schools
North Metro Academy of Performing Arts, Peachtree Corners

Duluth

New Life Academy of Excellence
Yi Hwang Academy of Language Excellence

Lawrenceville

GIVE Center East Middle/High School
Gwinnett School of Mathematics, Science, and Technology
Maxwell High School of Technology
Phoenix High School

Norcross

BIA Charter School
GIVE Center West Middle/High School

Private Schools

Hebron Christian Academy, Dacula
Notre Dame Academy, Duluth

Lilburn

Parkwood Christian Academy
Providence Christian Academy

Norcross

 Al Falah Academy
 Cornerstone Christian Academy
Greater Atlanta Christian School
Wesleyan School

Habersham County

Baldwin Elementary School, Baldwin
Tallulah Falls School, Tallulah Falls

Clarkesville

North Habersham Middle School
Clarkesville Elementary School
Woodville Elementary School

Cornelia

South Habersham Middle School
Cornelia Elementary School
Level Grove Elementary School

Demorest

Wilbanks Middle School
Demorest Elementary School
Fairview Elementary School

Mount Airy

Habersham Central High School
Habersham Ninth Grade Academy
Hazel Grove Elementary School

Private schools
Trinity Classical School

Hall County

Chattahoochee Christian School, Clermont
Friendship Elementary School, Buford
Lula Elementary School, Lula

Flowery Branch

High schools

Cherokee Bluff High School
Flowery Branch High School

Middle schools

Cherokee Bluff Middle School
Davis Middle School

Elementary schools

Chestnut Mountain Creative School of Inquiry
Flowery Branch Elementary School
Martin Elementary School/Technology Academy of Math & Science
Sprout Springs Elementary School
World Language Academy Elementary School

Gainesville

High schools

Chestatee High School
East Hall High School
Gainesville High School
Howard E. Ivester Early College
Johnson High School
Lanier College & Career Academy
North Hall High School

Middle schools

Academies of Discovery at South Hall
Chestatee Academy
East Hall Middle School
The Foundry School (6-12)
North Hall Middle School
World Language Academy Middle School

Elementary schools

Chicopee Woods Elementary School
Lanier Elementary School
Lyman Hall Elementary School
McEver Arts Academy
Mount Vernon Exploratory School
Myers Elementary School
Riverbend Elementary School
Sardis Elementary School
Sugar Hill Academy of Talent & Career
Tadmore Elementary School
Wauka Mountain Multiple Intelligences Academy
White Sulphur Elementary School

Private schools

Lakeview Academy
Riverside Military Academy

Oakwood

West Hall High School
West Hall Middle School
Oakwood Elementary School

Hancock County

Hancock Central High School, Sparta
Hancock Central Middle School
Lewis Elementary School

Private schools
John Hancock Academy

Haralson County

Buchanan, Georgia

Buchanan Elementary School
Buchanan Primary School

Tallapoosa

Haralson County High School
Haralson County Middle School
West Haralson Elementary School
Tallapoosa Primary School

Bremen City School District

Bremen High School
Bremen Middle School
Bremen 4th/5th Academy
Crossroad Academy
Jones Elementary School

Harris County

New Mountain Hill Elementary School, Fortson
Pine Ridge Elementary School, Ellerslie

Cataula

Creekside School
Mulberry Creek Elementary School

Hamilton

 Harris County High School
Harris County Middle School
Park Elementary School

Hart County
North Hart Elementary School, Bowersville

Hartwell

 Hart County High School
Hart County Middle School
Hartwell Elementary School
South Hart Elementary School

Heard County
Ephesus Elementary School, Roopville

Franklin

 Heard County High School
Heard County Middle School
Centralhatchee Elementary School
Heard County Elementary School

Henry County

Hampton

 Dutchtown High School
 Hampton High School
 Dutchtown Elementary School
 Hampton Elementary School
 Mt. Carmel Elementary School

Private schools
Bible Baptist Christian School

Locust Grove

 Locust Grove High School
 Luella High School
 Luella Middle School
 Bethlehem Elementary School
 Locust Grove Elementary School
 Luella Elementary School
 New Hope Elementary School
 Unity Grove Elementary School

Private schools
 Strong Rock Christian School

McDonough

High schools

 Eagle's Landing High School
 Henry County High School
 McDonough High School
 Ola High School
 Union Grove High School

Middle schools

 Eagle's Landing Middle School
 Henry County Middle School
 Ola Middle School
 Union Grove Middle School
 Woodland Middle School

Elementary schools

 East Lake Elementary School
 Flippen Elementary School
 Hickory Flat Elementary School
 McDonough Elementary School
 Oakland Elementary School
 Ola Elementary School
 Pleasant Grove Elementary School
 Rock Spring Elementary School
 Timber Ridge Elementary School
 Tussahaw Elementary School 
 Walnut Creek Elementary School
 Wesley Lakes Elementary School
 Woodland Elementary School

Private schools

 Creekside Christian Academy
 Eagle's Landing Christian Academy
 Living Word Christian Academy
 McDonough Methodist Academy
 New Creation Christian Academy

Stockbridge

High schools

 Patrick Henry High School
 Stockbridge High School
 Woodland High School

Middle schools

 Austin Road Middle School
 Dutchtown Middle School
 Patrick Henry Middle School
 Stockbridge Middle School

Elementary schools

 Austin Road Elementary School
 Cotton Indian Elementary School
 Fairview Elementary School
 Pate's Creek Elementary School
 Red Oak Elementary School
 Smith Barnes Elementary School
 Stockbridge Elementary School

Private schools
 Community Christian School

Houston County
Eagle Springs Elementary School, Byron

Bonaire

Bonaire Middle School
Bonaire Elementary School
Bonaire Primary School
Hilltop Elementary School

Centerville

Thomson Middle School
Centerville Elementary School

Kathleen

Veterans High School
Mossy Creek Middle School
Arthur Elementary School

Perry

Perry High School
Perry Middle School
Kings Chapel Elementary School
Langston Road Elementary School
Morningside Elementary School
Tucker Elementary School

Private schools
The Westfield School

Warner Robins

High schools

Houston County Career and Technology Center
Houston County High School
Northside High School
Warner Robins High School

Middle schools

Feagin Mill Middle School
Huntington Middle School
Northside Middle School
Warner Robins Middle School

Elementary schools

C.B. Watson Primary School
Lake Joy Elementary School
Lake Joy Primary School
Lindsey Elementary School
Miller Elementary School
Northside Elementary School
Parkwood Elementary School
Perdue Elementary School
Perdue Primary School
Quail Run Elementary School
Russell Elementary School
Shirley Hills Elementary School
Stephens Elementary School
Westside Elementary School

Private schools
Sacred Heart Catholic School

Irwin County

Irwin County High School, Ocilla
Irwin County Middle School
Irwin County Elementary School

Jackson County

Maysville Elementary School, Maysville
North Jackson Elementary School, Talmo
South Jackson Elementary School, Athens
West Jackson Elementary School, Hoschton

Commerce

East Jackson Comprehensive High School
East Jackson Middle School
East Jackson Elementary School

Jefferson

Empower College & Career Center
 Jackson County Comprehensive High School
West Jackson Middle School
Gum Springs Elementary School

Jasper County

 Jasper County High School, Monticello
Jasper County Middle School
Washington Park Elementary School
Jasper County Primary School

Private schools
Piedmont Academy

Jeff Davis County

 Jeff Davis High School, Hazlehurst
Jeff Davis Middle School
Jeff Davis Elementary School
Jeff Davis Primary School

Jefferson County

 Carver Elementary School, Wadley
 Wrens Elementary School, Wrens

Louisville

 Jefferson County High School
 Louisville Middle School
 Louisville Academy Elementary School

Private schools
 Thomas Jefferson Academy

Jenkins County

 Jenkins County High School, Millen
Jenkins County Middle School
Jenkins County Elementary School

Johnson County

 Johnson County High School, Wrightsville
Johnson County Middle School
Johnson County Elementary School

Jones County

Gray

Jones College & Career Academy
 Jones County High School
Gray Station Middle School
Dames Ferry Elementary School
Gray Elementary School
Turner Woods Elementary School

Macon

Clifton Ridge Middle School
Wells Elementary School

Lamar County
 St. George's Episcopal School, Milner

Barnesville

 Lamar County Comprehensive High School
 Lamar County Middle School
 Lamar County Elementary School
 Lamar County Primary School

Lanier County

 Lanier County High School, Lakeland
 Lanier County Middle School
 Lanier County Elementary School
 Lanier County Primary School

Laurens County

Northwest Laurens Elementary School, Dudley
Southwest Laurens Elementary School, Rentz

Dublin

High schools

 East Laurens High School
 West Laurens High School

Middle schools

East Laurens Middle School
West Laurens Middle School

Elementary schools

East Laurens Elementary School
East Laurens Primary School

Private schools
 Trinity Christian School

Dublin City School District (Georgia)

 Dublin High School
Heart of Georgia College & Career Academy
Dublin Middle School
Hillcrest Elementary School
The Irish Gifted Academy (K-8)
Susie Dasher Elementary School

Lee County

Lee County High School, Leesburg
Lee County Middle School (East/West Campus)
Kinchafoonee Primary School
Lee County Elementary School
Lee County Primary School
Twin Oaks Elementary School
Bob Primary School

Liberty County
 Midway Middle School, Midway

Hinesville

 Bradwell Institute
 Liberty College & Career Academy
 Liberty County High School
 Snelson-Golden Middle School
 Button Gwinnett Elementary School
 Joseph Martin Elementary School
 Lyman Hall Elementary School
 Taylors Creek Elementary School

Private schools
 First Presbyterian Christian Academy

Lincoln County

 Lincoln County High School, Lincolnton
 Lincoln County Middle School
 Lincoln County Elementary School

Lowndes County

Valdosta

High schools

 Lowndes Alternative High School
 Lowndes High School

Middle schools

 Hahira Middle School
 Lowndes Alternative Middle School
 Lowndes Middle School
 Pine Grove Middle School

Elementary schools

 Clyattville Elementary School
 Dewar Elementary School
 Hahira Elementary School
 Lake Park Elementary School
 Moulton-Branch Elementary School
 Pine Grove Elementary School
 Westside Elementary School

Private/Charter schools

 Georgia Christian School
 Highland Christian Academy
 Open Bible Christian School
 Scintilla Charter Academy
 Valwood School

Valdosta City School District

 Valdosta High School
 Newbern Middle School
 Valdosta Early College Academy (6-12)
 Valdosta Middle School
 J.L. Lomax Elementary School
 Pinevale Elementary School
 S.L. Mason Elementary School
 Sallas-Mahone Elementary School
 W.G. Nunn Elementary School

Lumpkin County

 Lumpkin County High School
 Lumpkin County Middle School
 Blackburn Elementary School
 Long Branch Elementary School
 Lumpkin County Elementary School

Macon County

 Macon County High School, Montezuma
 Macon County Middle School
 Macon County Elementary School

Madison County

 Colbert Elementary School, Colbert
 Hull-Sanford Elementary School, Hull, Georgia
 Ila Elementary School, Ila

Comer

 Madison County Middle School
 Comer Elementary School

Danielsville

 Broad River College & Career Academy
 Madison County High School
 Danielsville Elementary School

Marion County

 Marion County Middle/High School, Buena Vista
 L.K. Moss Primary School

McDuffie County
 Dearing Elementary School, Dearing

Thomson

 Thomson High School
 McDuffie Achievement Academy
 Thomson-McDuffie Middle School
 Maxwell Elementary School
 Norris Elementary School
 Thomson Elementary School

McIntosh County

 McIntosh County Academy, Darien
 McIntosh County Middle School
 Todd Grant Elementary School

Meriwether County
Flint River Academy, Woodbury
 Unity Elementary School, Luthersville

Greenville

 Greenville High School
 Greenville Middle School

Manchester

 Manchester High School
 Manchester Middle School
 Mountain View Elementary School

Miller County

 Miller County High School, Colquitt
 Miller County Middle School
 Miller County Elementary School

Mitchell County
 Baconton Community Charter School, Baconton

Camilla

 Mitchell County High School
 Mitchell County Middle School
 Mitchell County Elementary School
 Mitchell County Primary School

Private schools
 Westwood Schools

Pelham City School District

 Pelham High School (Georgia)
 Pelham Middle School
 Pelham Elementary School

Monroe County

 Mary Persons High School, Forsyth
 Monroe County Middle School
 Katherine B. Sutton Elementary School
 Samuel E. Hubbard Elementary School
 T.G. Scott Elementary School

Private schools
 Monroe Academy

Montgomery County

 Montgomery County High School, Mount Vernon
 Montgomery County Middle School
 Montgomery County Elementary School

Morgan County

 Morgan County Crossroads School
 Morgan County High School, Madison
 Morgan County Middle School
 Morgan County Elementary School
 Morgan County Primary School

Murray County
(all schools in Chatsworth, Georgia)

High schools

 Murray County High School
 North Murray High School
 Pleasant Valley Innovative School

Middle schools

 Bagley Middle School
 Gladden Middle School

Elementary schools

 Chatsworth Elementary School
 Coker Elementary School
 Eton Elementary School
 Northwest Elementary School
 Spring Place Elementary School
 Woodlawn Elementary School

Private schools
 Canaanland Christian School

Muscogee County
(all schools in Columbus, Georgia)

High schools

 Columbus High School
 George Washington Carver High School
 Hardaway High School
 Jordan Vocational High School
 Kendrick High School
 Northside High School
 Shaw High School
 Spencer High School

Middle schools

 Aaron Cohn Middle School
 Arnold Magnet Academy
 Baker Middle School
 Blackmon Road Middle School
 Double Churches Middle School
 East Columbus Magnet Academy
 Eddy Middle School
 Fort Middle School
 Midland Middle School
 Rainey-McCullers School of the Arts (6-12)
 Richards Middle School
 Rothschild Leadership Academy
 Veterans Memorial Middle School

Elementary schools

 Allen Elementary School
 Benning Hills Elementary School
 Blanchard Elementary School
 Brewer Elementary School
 Britt David Elementary School
 Clubview Elementary School
 Davis Elementary School
 Dawson Elementary Schoo
 Dimon Elementary School
 Double Churches Elementary School
 Dorothy Height Elementary School
 Downtown Elementary School
 Eagle Ridge Academy
 Edgewood Elementary School
 Forrest Road Elementary School
 Fox Elementary School
 Gentian Elementary School
 Georgetown Elementary School
 Hannan Elementary School
 Johnson Elementary School
 Key Elementary School
 Lonnie Jackson Academy, Columbus
 Martin Luther King, Jr. Elementary School
 Mathews Elementary School
 Midland Academy
 North Columbus Elementary School
 Reese Road Elementary School
 Rigdon Road Elementary School
 River Road Elementary School
 South Columbus Elementary School
 St. Marys Elementary School
 Waddell Elementary School
 Wesley Heights Elementary School
 Wynnton Elementary School

Private schools

 Brookstone School
 Calvary Christian School
 Grace Christian School
 Hallie Turner Private School
 Our Lady of Lourdes School
 Pacelli High School
 Pinehurst Christian School
 St. Anne School
 St. Luke School
 Wynnbrook Christian School

Oconee County

 Dove Creek Elementary School, Statham
 High Shoals Elementary School, Bishop

Bogart

 North Oconee High School
 Malcom Bridge Middle School
 Malcom Bridge Elementary School
 Rocky Branch Elementary School

Watkinsville

 Oconee County High School
 Oconee County Middle School
 Colham Ferry Elementary School
 Oconee County Elementary School
 Oconee County Primary School

Private schools

 Athens Academy, Athens
 Prince Avenue Christian School, Bogart
 Westminster Christian Academy, Watkinsville

Oglethorpe County

 Oglethorpe County High School, Lexington
 Oglethorpe County Middle School
 Oglethorpe County Elementary School
 Oglethorpe County Primary School

Paulding County

 New Georgia Elementary School, Villa Rica
 Ragsdale Elementary School, Rockmart
 Union Elementary School, Temple

Dallas

High schools

 East Paulding High School
 North Paulding High School
 Paulding County High School

Middle schools

 Austin Middle School
 East Paulding Middle School
 Herschel Jones Middle School
 Moses Middle School
 Scoggins Middle School
 P.B. Ritch Middle School
 South Paulding Middle School
 Sammy McClure Middle School

Elementary schools

 Abney Elementary School
 Allgood Elementary School
 Burnt Hickory Elementary School
 Dallas Elementary School
 Nebo Elementary School
 Northside Elementary School
 Poole Elementary School
 Roberts Elementary School
 Russom Elementary School
 Shelton Elementary School

Douglasville

 South Paulding High School
 Dugan Elementary School
 Hutchens Elementary School

Hiram

 Hiram High School
 Hiram Elementary School
 McGarity Elementary School
 Panter Elementary School

Powder Springs

 Dobbins Middle School
 Baggett Elementary School

Peach County

Byron

 Byron Middle School
 Byron Elementary School

Fort Valley

 Peach County High School
 Fort Valley Middle School
 Hunt Elementary School
 Kay Road Elementary School

Pickens County
 Tate Elementary School, Tate

Jasper

 Pickens High School
 Jasper Middle School
 Pickens County Junior High
 Harmony Elementary School
 Hill City Elementary School

Pierce County
 Patterson Elementary School, Patterson

Blackshear

 Pierce County High School
 Pierce County Middle School
 Blackshear Elementary School
 Midway Elementary School

Pike County

 Pike County High School, Zebulon
 Pike Zebulon High School
 Pike County 9th Grade Academy
 Pike County Middle School
 Pike County Elementary School
 Pike County Primary School

Polk County

Cedartown

 Cedartown High School
 Polk County College & Career Academy
 Cedartown Middle School
 Cherokee Elementary School
 Northside Elementary School
 Westside Elementary School
 Youngs Grove Elementary School

Rockmart

 Rockmart High School
 Rockmart Middle School
 Eastside Elementary School
 Van Wert Elementary School

Pulaski County

 Hawkinsville High School, Hawkinsville
 Pulaski County Middle School
 Pulaski County Elementary School

Putnam County

 Putnam County High School, Eatonton
 Putnam County Middle School
 Putnam County Elementary School
 Putnam County Primary School

Private schools
Gatewood Schools

Quitman County

 Quitman County High School, Georgetown
 New Quitman County Elementary/Middle School

Rabun County
 Rabun Gap-Nacoochee School, Rabun Gap

Tiger

 Rabun County High School
 Rabun County Middle School
 Rabun County Elementary School
 Rabun County Primary School

Randolph County

 Randolph Clay High School, Cuthbert
 Randolph Clay Middle School
 Randolph County Elementary School
Southwest Georgia STEM Charter School

Richmond County

 Blythe Elementary School, Blythe
 Freedom Park K-8 School, Gordon

Augusta

High schools

 Academy of Richmond County
 Butler High School
 Cross Creek High School
 Glenn Hills High School
 Lucy Craft Laney High School
 T. W. Josey High School/Marion E. Barnes Career Center
 Westside High School

Middle schools

 Glenn Hills Middle School
 Langford Middle School
 Murphey Middle School
 Tutt Middle School
 W.S. Hornsby Middle School

Elementary schools

 A. Brian Merry Elementary School
 Barton Chapel Elementary School
 Bayvale Elementary School
 Belair PreK-8 School
 Copeland Elementary School
 Garrett Elementary School
 Glenn Hills Elementary School
 Goshen Elementary School
 Gracewood Elementary School
 Hains Elementary School
 Jenkins White Elementary School
 Lake Forest Hills Elementary School
 Lamar-Milledge Elementary School
 Meadowbrook Elementary School
 Monte Sano Elementary School
 Richmond Hill K-8 School
 Sue Reynolds Elementary School
 Terrace Manor Elementary School
 Tobacco Road Elementary School
 W.S. Hornsby Elementary School
 Warren Road Elementary School
 Wheeless Road Elementary School
 Wilkinson Gardens Elementary School

Magnet schools

 A. R. Johnson Health Science and Engineering Magnet High School
 C. T. Walker Traditional Magnet School
 John S. Davidson Fine Arts Magnet School
 Richmond County Technical Career Magnet School

Private schools

 Aquinas High School
 Curtis Baptist High School
 Episcopal Day School
 Westminster Schools of Augusta

Hephzibah

 Hephzibah High School
 Alternative School at Morgan Road (6-12)
 Hephzibah Middle School
 Pine Hill Middle School
 Spirit Creek Middle School
 Deer Chase Elementary School
 Diamond Lakes Elementary School
Georgia School for Innovation and the Classics
 Hephzibah Elementary School
 Jamestown Elementary School
 McBean Elementary School
 Willis Foreman Elementary School

Rockdale County
(all schools in Conyers, Georgia)

High schools 

 Heritage High School
 Rockdale Career Academy
 Rockdale County High School
 Rockdale Magnet School for Science and Technology
 Salem High School

Middle schools

 Conyers Middle School
 Edwards Middle School
 General Ray Davis Middle School
 Memorial Middle School

Elementary schools

 Barksdale Elementary School
 C.J. Hicks Elementary School
 Flat Shoals Elementary School
 Hightower Trail Elementary School
 Honey Creek Elementary School
 J.H. House Elementary School
 Lorraine Elementary School
 Peeks Chapel Elementary School
 Pine Street Elementary School
 Shoal Creek Elementary School
 Sims Elementary School

Private schools
 Young Americans Christian School

Schley County

 Schley Middle High School, Ellaville
 Schley County Elementary School

Screven County

 Screven County High School, Sylvania
 Screven County Middle School
 Screven County Elementary School

Private schools
Screven Christian Academy

Seminole County

 Seminole County Middle/High School, Donalsonville
 Seminole County Elementary School

Spalding County
(all schools in Griffin, Georgia)

High schools

 A.Z. Kelsey Academy
 Griffin High School
 Spalding High School

Middle schools

 Carver Road Middle School
 Cowan Road Middle School
 Kennedy Road Middle School
 Rehoboth Road Middle School

Elementary schools

 Anne Street Elementary School
 Atkinson Elementary School
 Beaverbrook Elementary School
 Cowan Road Elementary School
 Crescent Road Elementary School
 Futral Road Elementary School
 Jackson Road Elementary School
 Jordan Hill Road Elementary School
 Moore Elementary School
 Moreland Road Elementary School
 Orrs Elementary School

Stephens County
 Big A Elementary School, Eastanollee

Toccoa

 Stephens County High School
 Stephens County Middle School
 Stephens County 5th Grade Academy
 Liberty Elementary School
 Toccoa Elementary School

Stewart County

 Stewart County High School, Lumpkin
 Stewart County Middle School
 Stewart County Elementary School

Sumter County
(all schools in Americus, Georgia)

 Ignite College and Career Academy
 Sumter Central High School
 Sumter County Middle School
 Sumter County Intermediate School
 Sumter County Elementary School
 Sumter County Primary School

Private/Charter schools

Furlow Charter School
 Southland Academy

Talbot County
 Central Elementary/High School, Talbotton

Taliaferro County
 Taliaferro County Charter School (K-12), Crawfordville

Tattnall County
 Collins Elementary School, Collins

Glennville

 South Tattnall Middle School
 Glennville Elementary School

Reidsville

 Tattnall County High School
 North Tattnall Middle School
 Reidsville Elementary School

Taylor County

 Taylor County High School, Butler
 Taylor County Middle School
 Taylor County Upper Elementary School
 Taylor County Primary School

Telfair County

 Telfair County High School, McRae
 Telfair County Middle School
 Telfair County Elementary School

Terrell County

 Terrell High School, Dawson
 Terrell Middle School
 Carver Elementary School
 Lillie Cooper Primary School

Private schools
 Terrell Academy

Thomas County
(all schools in Thomasville, Georgia)

 Bishop Hall Charter School
 Thomas County Central High School
 Thomas County Middle School
 Thomas County Upper Elementary School
 Cross Creek Elementary School
 Garrison-Pilcher Elementary School
 Hand-in-Hand Primary School

Thomasville City School District

 Thomasville High School
 Thomasville High Scholars Academy
 MacIntyre Park Middle School
 Harper Elementary School
 Jerger Elementary School
 Scott Elementary School

Private schools

 Brookwood School
 Thomasville Christian School

Tift County

 Omega Elementary School, Omega (K-6)
 Tiftarea Academy, Chula

Tifton

 Tift County High School
 Sixth Street Academy (6-12)

Middle schools

 Eighth Street Middle School
 Northeast Middle School

Elementary schools

 Annie Belle Clark Primary School
 Charles Spencer Elementary School
 G.O. Bailey Primary School
 J. T. Reddick Elementary School
 Len Lastinger Primary School
 Matt Wilson Elementary School
 Northside Primary School

Private schools

 Grace Baptist Christian School, Tifton
Providence School of Tifton

Toombs County

 Toombs County High School, Lyons
 Toombs County Middle School
 Lyons Upper Elementary School
 Toombs Central Elementary School
 Lyons Primary School

Vidalia City School District

 Vidalia Comprehensive High School, Vidalia
 J.R. Trippe Middle School
 Sally Dailey Meadows Elementary School
 J.D. Dickerson Primary School

Private schools
 Robert Toombs Christian Academy, Lyons

Towns County

 Towns County High School, Hiawassee
 Towns County Middle School
 Towns County Elementary School

Troup County
 West Point Elementary School, West Point

Hogansville

 Callaway High School
 Hogansville Elementary School

LaGrange

High schools

 LaGrange High School
 Thinc Academy
 Troup County Career Center
 Troup County High School

Middle schools

 Callaway Middle School
 Gardner Newman Middle School
 The Hope Academy (6-12)
 Long Cane Middle School

Elementary schools

 Berta Weathersbee Elementary School
 Callaway Elementary School
 Cannon Street Elementary School
 Hollis Hand Elementary School
 Long Cane Elementary School
 Rosemont Elementary School

Private schools
 LaGrange Academy

Turner County

 Turner County High School, Ashburn
 Turner County Specialty School
 Turner County Middle School
 Turner County Elementary School

Twiggs County

 Twiggs County High School, Jeffersonville
 Twiggs Middle School
 Jeffersonville Elementary

Private schools
 Twiggs Academy

Union County

 Union County High School, Blairsville
 Union County Middle School
 Union County Elementary School
 Union County Primary School
 Woody Gap School (K-12)

Upson County

 Upson-Lee High School, Thomaston
 Upson-Lee Middle School
 Upson-Lee Elementary School
 Upson-Lee Primary School

Walker County

 Cherokee Ridge Elementary School, Chickamauga
 Fairyland Elementary School, Lookout Mountain

Flintstone

 Chattanooga Valley Middle School
 Chattanooga Valley Elementary School

Lafayette

 LaFayette High School
 LaFayette Middle School
 Gilbert Elementary School
 Naomi Elementary School
 North LaFayette Elementary School

Rock Spring

 Rock Spring Elementary School
 Saddle Ridge School

Rossville

 Ridgeland High School
 Rossville Middle School
 Rossville Elementary School
 Stone Creek Elementary School

Chickamauga City Schools

 Gordon Lee High School
 Gordon Lee Middle School
 Chickamauga Elementary School

Walton County
 Walnut Grove Elementary School, Covington

Loganville

High schools

 Loganville High School
 Walnut Grove High School

Middle schools

 Loganville Middle School
 Youth Middle School

Elementary schools

 Bay Creek Elementary School
 Loganville Elementary School
 Sharon Elementary School
 Youth Elementary School

Private schools
 Loganville Christian Academy

Monroe

 Monroe Area High School
 Carver Middle School
 Atha Road Elementary School
 Harmony Elementary School
 Monroe Elementary School
 Walker Park Elementary School

Private schools
 George Walton Academy

Social Circle City School District

 Social Circle High School
 Social Circle Middle School

Ware County
(all schools in Waycross, Georgia)

 Ware County High School
 Ware County Alternative School
 Ware County Middle School
 Waycross Middle School
 Center Elementary School
 Memorial Drive Elementary School
 Ruskin Elementary School
 Wacona Elementary School
 Waresboro Elementary School
 Williams Heights Elementary School

Washington County

 Washington County High School, Sandersville
 T.J. Elder Middle School
 Ridge Road Elementary School
 Ridge Road Primary School

Private schools
Brentwood School

Wayne County

 Odum Elementary School, Odum
 Screven Elementary School, Screven

Jesup

 Wayne County High School
 Arthur Williams Middle School
 Martha Puckett Middle School
 James E. Bacon Elementary School
 Jesup Elementary School
 Martha R. Smith Elementary School

Webster County

 Webster County High School, Preston
 Webster County Elementary/Middle School

Wheeler County

 Wheeler County Middle/High School, Alamo
 Wheeler County Elementary School

White County
 Mt. Yonah Elementary School, Sautee

Cleveland

 White County High School
 Warrior Academy Alternative School
 White County Middle School
 Jack P. Nix Elementary School
 Mossy Creek Elementary School
 Tesnatee Gap Elementary School

Whitfield County
 Varnell Elementary School, Varnell

Dalton

High schools

 Coahulla Creek High School
 Northwest Georgia College & Career Academy
 Phoenix High School
 Southeast High School

Middle schools

 Crossroads Middle/High School
 Eastbrook Middle School
 North Whitfield Middle School
 Valley Point Middle School

Elementary schools

 Antioch Elementary School
 Beaverdale Elementary School
 Cedar Ridge Elementary School
 Cohutta Elementary School
 Dawnville Elementary School
 Dug Gap Elementary School
 Eastside Elementary School
 Pleasant Grove Elementary School
 Valley Point Elementary School

Private schools
Christian Heritage School

Rocky Face

 Westside Middle School
 Westside Elementary School

Tunnel Hill

 Northwest Whitfield High School
 New Hope Middle School
 New Hope Elementary School
 Tunnel Hill Elementary School

Dalton City Schools

 Dalton High School
 The Dalton Academy
 Dalton Junior High School
 Hammond Creek Middle School
 Blue Ridge Elementary School
 Brookwood Elementary School
 City Park Elementary School
 Park Creek Elementary School
 Roan Elementary School
 Westwood Elementary School

Wilcox County

 Wilcox County High School, Rochelle
 Wilcox County Middle School
 Wilcox County Elementary School

Wilkes County

 Washington-Wilkes Comprehensive High School, Washington
 Washington-Wilkes Middle School
 Washington-Wilkes Elementary School
 Washington-Wilkes Primary School

Wilkinson County

 Wilkinson County High School, Irwinton
 Wilkinson County Middle School
 Wilkinson County Elementary School
 Wilkinson County Primary School

Worth County

 Worth County High School, Sylvester
 Worth County Middle School
 Worth County Elementary School
 Worth County Primary School

See also
 List of school districts in Georgia (U.S. state)

References

External links
 Georgia Department of Education
 Georgia Independent School Association (GISA) Private School
 Best Georgia Schools List